George Kenyon Holden,  (1808 – 16 April 1874) was an Australian Crown Prosecutor, banker and politician who served on the New South Wales Legislative Council. In correspondence with his associate John Stuart Mill, he was one of the first politicians in the world to propose proportional representation to parliament in 1861.

Holden was a trustee of the New South Wales Savings Bank, a director of the Liverpool and London Fire and Life Insurance Company, the chairman of the National Schools Board, and president of the Sydney Mechanics' School of Arts. He was also an active environmentalist as a founding member of the Acclimatisation Society of New South Wales.

Family
He was born in Worcester, England to Adam Holden and Maria (née Gillam). His daughter Mary Jane married another New South Wales politician and businessman, John Brown Watt; their third son was Ernest Alexander Stuart Watt (1874-1954), whose daughter Susan Gai Watt married into the Street dynasty by wedding Sir Laurence Whistler Street. Holden died at Darlinghurst in 1874.

In the Law 
Holden studied law and became a solicitor, migrating to New South Wales in 1831. He was private secretary to Governor Sir Richard Bourke during his term (1831–37), and was also a stipendiary magistrate at Campbelltown. In 1837 he became Crown Prosecutor in the Quarter Sessions, and in 1838 he began private practice as a solicitor. He was a member of the New South Wales Legislative Council from 1856 to 1861 and from 1861 to 1863. Holden was inspired by John Stuart Mill to advocate a proportional representation electoral system using the Hare quota, as had been recommended by Mill in their letters. He made the proposal to parliament in 1861. An active member of parliament, Holden was secretary of the Law Commission between 1848 and 1850.

Education
In 1849, Holden was made a member of the Board of National Education and served as such until the Board was replaced by the Council of Education in 1867. During his tenure, Holden also served as the chairman of the National Schools Board through 1865. His interest in education, as with land title reform, was likely rooted in his time as Governor Bourke's private secretary, as Bourke had been a strong advocate of public education.

Environmentalism

In 1861, he co-founded the Acclimatisation Society of New South Wales. The Society worked to introduce, acclimatise and domesticate 'useful or ornamental' birds, fish, insects, vegetables and other exotic species. Among other species introduced to Australia by the Society are alpacas, sunflowers, watercress and pheasants. During the 1860s, the Acclimatisation Society also erected a number of cages in the Sydney Botanic Gardens in which they kept a collection of introduced birds such as pheasants, blackbirds and thrushes, which acted as part storage aviary and part exotic zoo.

References

1808 births
1874 deaths
Members of the New South Wales Legislative Council
19th-century Australian politicians